Kim Jong-dae (born September 21, 1992) is a male freestyle wrestler from South Korea. He participated in Men's freestyle 60 kg at 2008 Summer Olympics losing in the 1/8 of final with Murad Ramazanov.

External links
 Wrestler bio on beijing2008.com

Know all about Kim Jong Dae

Living people
1981 births
Olympic wrestlers of South Korea
South Korean male sport wrestlers
Wrestlers at the 2008 Summer Olympics
Wrestlers at the 2002 Asian Games
Korea National Sport University alumni
Asian Games competitors for South Korea
21st-century South Korean people